VNUHCM-University of Science (VNUHCM-US; formerly known as University of Sciences) has offered various scientific degrees across Southern Vietnam since its establishment as the Indochina College of Science in 1941.

VNUHCM-US was re-founded in March 1996 following a split from Đại học Tổng hợp (lit. translation: Ho Chi Minh City University). The school has since been a member university of Vietnam National University, Ho Chi Minh City.

Due to some internal reforms, at the beginning of 1996, the Faculty of Science became the University of Natural Sciences -  one of the five affiliated universities of the Vietnam National University, Ho Chi Minh City. In 2007, the university was officially renamed as the University of Science.
Since 2007, VNUHCM – US has been a public university playing an important role in offering education and scientific research within the VNUHCM system.

It is entrusted with providing education at undergraduate levels and postgraduate levels and undertaking scientific research as well as technological transfer. As of July 2022, the university has more than 17,000 enrolled students including:

 52 undergraduate programs
 40 graduate programs
 29 PhD programs
 2 joint bachelor programs
The two joint bachelor programs include Bachelor of Computer & Information Sciences with a major in IT Service Science collaborated with Auckland University of Technology, New Zealand; Bachelor of Science in Management collaborated with a major in International Business collaborated with Keuka College, USA

The university provides several education professions: Biology, Chemistry, Electronic & Communications, Environment, Geology, Information Technology, Math & Computer Science, Materials Science, Oceanography, Physics.

The university has two campuses: One in District 5 of Ho Chi Minh City and one in Thu Duc City.

History

The school was originally a department from the Indochina College of Science, which began operating in 1946. In 1956, this department was renamed "Science department" and merged to form Saigon University. In 1977, it merged with several other school and colleges to form the Commons University. In March 1996, the university reformed HCMUNS is a separate instutituion again, as a member of the Vietnam National University, Ho Chi Minh City (VNU-HCM).

Timeline

 In 1941, the School of Science was established by the Division of Indochina Science College.
 In 1956, the school was upgraded with a new called University of Saigon.
 In 1977, the university was merged with the School of Letters calling The HoChiMinh City University.
 In 1996, the University of Natural Science was officially founded in affiliate with the Vietnam National University, Ho Chi Minh City.
 In 2007, the name was revised as University of Science to mark a new stage of the teaching of sophisticated sciences and computer technology.

The president of the university is Prof. Trần Lê Quan.

Faculties
 Faculty of Mathematics and Computer Science
 Faculty of Information Technology
 Faculty of Physics and Engineering Physics
 Faculty of Electronics & Telecommunications
 Faculty of Chemistry
 Faculty of Biology & Biotechnology
 Faculty of Geology
 Faculty of Environment
 Faculty of Materials Science and Technology

Honor Program 
The Honor Program is one of the strategic solutions of Vietnam National University, according to Decree 07/2001 / NĐ-CP of the Government on National University with the goal of training the excellent students, providing the human resources in research fields, professors and experts in the cutting edge technologies.
 Bachelor of Science in Computer Science (Duration: 4 years)
 Bachelor of Science in Chemistry (Duration: 4 years)
 Bachelor of Science in Physics (Duration: 4 years)
 Bachelor of Science in Mathematics (Duration: 4 years)
All students in Honor Program must have thesis to graduate.

See also
 List of universities in Vietnam
 Vietnam National University, Ho Chi Minh City

External links
Official website

References

Universities in Ho Chi Minh City